Balaji Temple (Devanagari: बालाजी मन्दिर) in Mehandipur, Karauli district on the border of Karauli district and Dausa district, is a Hindu temple dedicated to the Hindu deity Hanuman. The name Balaji refers to Shri Hanuman in several parts of India because the childhood (Bala in Hindi or Sanskrit) form of the Lord is especially celebrated there. The temple is dedicated to Balaji (another name for Shree Hanuman Ji). Unlike similar religious sites it is located in a town rather than the countryside. Its reputation for ritualistic healing and exorcism of evil spirits attracts many pilgrims from Rajasthan and elsewhere.

Overview

The temple of Balaji Maharaj built in Mehandipur is very famous especially in northern part of India. The first Mahant of the temple was Shri Ganeshpuriji Maharaj and the present Mahant of the temple Shri Naresh Puriji Maharaj is very strict to follow vegetarian and reading holy books.

It is believed that a person who is suffering from evil spirits (Sankatwalas) get relief from distress by methods like Arji, Sawamani, and Darkhast. Bhog of Boondi ke Laddu offering to Shri Balaji Maharaj, Rice and Urad pulse to Bhairav Baba (Kotval Kaptan, head of army and Shri Pretraj Sarkar, king of evil spirits). Saturday and Tuesday are the busiest days in the temple because both these days are the days of Hanumanji. Some other temples near Balaji temple are Shri Sitaram Darbar, Samadhi Wale Baba (the first mahant), are some important temples in Mehandipur Balaji.

Research
The temple has been known for many years, for exorcism from evil spirits attachments and black magic or spells. In 2013, an international team of scientist, scholars and psychiatrists from Germany, Netherlands, AIIMS, New Delhi, and University of Delhi started a study to evaluate all aspects of treatment and rituals at the temple.

Location 

The temple is situated in Brahmbad, Dausa District near Todabhim of the Indian state of Rajasthan. The village is situated at the border of two districts- Karauli and Dausa. And the temple is also divided as half and another half in districts by border. It is 109 km from Jaipur.

Divided into two districts (Karauli and Dausa) of Rajasthan State, Ghata Mehdipur place is 30 km from Bandikui Junction railway station situated in centre on Delhi-Agra-Jaipur line. Which is the nearest railway station from Mehandipur Balaji. 24 hours bus, jeep, taxi etc. facility is available from Bandikui Junction to Mehandipur Balaji Dham. Direct buses going to Jaipur from Agra, Mathura, Vrindavan, Aligarh etc all stop at Mehandipur Balaji turn.

See also
 Salasar Balaji

Notes

References

, Chapter 3, "Lord of the Spirit World"

External links

Hindu temples in Rajasthan
Hanuman temples
Tourist attractions in Karauli district
Tourist attractions near Hindaun
Tourist attractions in Dausa district
Exorcism in Hinduism